Switzerland competed at the 2022 Winter Olympics in Beijing, China, from 4 to 20 February 2022.

Alpine skier Wendy Holdener and hockey player Andres Ambühl were selected as the Swiss flagbearers during the opening ceremony Meanwhile freestyle skier Ryan Regez was the flagbearer during the closing ceremony.

Competitors
The following is the list of number of competitors participating at the Games per sport/discipline.

Medalists

The following Swiss competitors won medals at the games. In the discipline sections below, the medalists' names are bolded.

Alpine skiing

Switzerland qualified the maximum eleven male and eleven female alpine skiers.

Men

Women

Mixed

Biathlon

Men

Women

Mixed

Bobsleigh

Cross-country skiing

Switzerland qualified eight male and six female cross-country skiers.

Distance
Men

Women

Sprint

Curling

Summary

Men's tournament

Switzerland has qualified their men's team (five athletes), by finishing in the top six teams in the 2021 World Men's Curling Championship. Team Peter de Cruz qualified as Swiss representatives by winning the 2021 Swiss Olympic Curling Trials, defeating Yannick Schwaller 4–0 in the best-of-seven event.

Round robin
Switzerland had a bye in draws 2, 6 and 10.

Draw 1
Wednesday, 9 February, 20:05

Draw 3
Friday, 11 February, 9:05

Draw 4
Friday, 11 February, 20:05

Draw 5
Saturday, 12 February, 14:05

Draw 7
Sunday, 13 February, 20:05

Draw 8
Monday, 14 February, 14:05

Draw 9
Tuesday, 15 February, 9:05

Draw 11
Wednesday, 16 February, 14:05

Draw 12
Thursday, 17 February, 9:05

Women's tournament

Switzerland has qualified their women's team (five athletes), by finishing in the top six teams in the 2021 World Women's Curling Championship. Team Silvana Tirinzoni qualified as Swiss representatives as they finished in the top six at the 2021 Women's Worlds and reached the playoffs at the 2019 European Curling Championships.

Round robin
Switzerland had a bye in draws 4, 7 and 11.

Draw 1
Thursday, 10 February, 9:05

Draw 2
Thursday, 10 February, 20:05

Draw 3
Friday, 11 February, 14:05

Draw 5
Saturday, 12 February, 20:05

Draw 6
Sunday, 13 February, 14:05

Draw 8
Monday, 14 February, 20:05

Draw 9
Tuesday, 15 February, 14:05

Draw 10
Wednesday, 16 February, 9:05

Draw 12
Thursday, 17 February, 14:05

Semifinal
Friday, 18 February, 20:05

Bronze medal game
Saturday, 19 February, 20:05

Mixed doubles tournament

Switzerland has qualified their mixed doubles team (two athletes), by finishing in the top seven teams in the 2021 World Mixed Doubles Curling Championship. On 28 September 2021, the Swiss Olympic Association announced that Jenny Perret and Martin Rios would be their mixed doubles representatives.

Round robin
Switzerland had a bye in draws 2, 6, 8 and 10.

Draw 1
Wednesday, 2 February, 20:05

Draw 3
Thursday, 3 February, 14:05

Draw 4
Thursday, 3 February, 20:05

Draw 5
Friday, 4 February, 8:35

Draw 7
Saturday, 5 February, 9:05

Draw 9
Saturday, 5 February, 20:05

Draw 11
Sunday, 6 February, 14:05

Draw 12
Sunday, 6 February, 20:05

Draw 13
Monday, 7 February, 9:05

Figure skating

In the 2021 World Figure Skating Championships in Stockholm, Sweden, Switzerland secured one quota in the men's competition.

Freestyle skiing

Aerials

Freeski

Moguls

Ski cross
{|class=wikitable style=font-size:90%;text-align:center
!rowspan="2"|Athlete
!rowspan="2"|Event
!colspan="2"|Seeding
!Round of 16
!Quarterfinal
!Semifinal
!colspan=2|Final
|-style="font-size:95%"
!Time
!Rank
!Position
!Position
!Position
!Position
!Rank
|-
|align=left|Joos Berry
|align=left rowspan=4|Men's
|1:13.43
|21
|2 Q
|4
|colspan=2|Did not advance
|16
|-
|align=left|Romain Detraz
|1:13.69
|27
|3
|colspan=3|Did not advance
|24
|-
|align=left|Alex Fiva
|1:11.94
|1
|1 Q
|1 Q
|1 BF
|2
|
|-
|align=left|Ryan Regez
|1:12.44
|7
|1 Q
|1 Q
|2 BF
|1
|
|-
|align=left|Talina Gantenbein
|align=left rowspan=3|Women's
|1:18.31
|9
|2 Q
|3
|colspan=2|Did not advance
|9
|-
|align=left|Saskja Lack
|1:19.21
|13
|3
|colspan=3|Did not advance
|18
|-
|align=left|Fanny Smith
|1:17.06
|2
|1 Q''
|1 Q|2 BF|3
|
|}
 

Ice hockey

Summary
Key:
 OT – Overtime
 GWS – Match decided by penalty-shootout

Switzerland has qualified 25 male competitors, and 23 female competitors to the ice hockey tournaments.

Men's tournament

Switzerland men's national ice hockey team qualified by being ranked 8th in the 2019 IIHF World Rankings.

Team roster

Group play

Playoffs

Quarterfinals

Women's tournament

Switzerland women's national ice hockey team qualified by being ranked 5th in the 2020 IIHF World Rankings.

Team roster

Group playQuarterfinalsSemifinalsBronze medal game'''

Luge

Based on the results during the 2021–22 Luge World Cup season, Switzerland qualified 1 sled in the women's singles.

Skeleton

Ski jumping

Men

Snowboarding

Freestyle

Parallel

Snowboard cross

Speed skating

Switzerland qualified two speed skaters (one of each gender).

Mass start

See also
Switzerland at the 2022 Winter Paralympics

References

Nations at the 2022 Winter Olympics
2022
Winter Olympics